The Tilletiariaceae are a family of smut fungi in the Basidiomycota, class Exobasidiomycetes. Species in the family have a widespread distribution, and typically grow biotrophically in the leaves and flowers of various grasses.

References

Ustilaginomycotina
Fungal plant pathogens and diseases